The Fiji International was a men's golf tournament in Fiji, originally sanctioned by the PGA Tour of Australasia. The event was Fiji's first internationally broadcast golf tournament to a worldwide audience across more than 30 countries in over 400 million homes, a first for a single sporting event in Fiji.

The inaugural tournament was held from 14–17 August 2014 at Natadola Bay Championship Golf Course. It was a tier one event on the PGA Tour of Australasia and was co-sanctioned with OneAsia. The purse for the event was US$1,000,000. The 2015 event was played in October with a A$1,125,000 purse and was again co-sanctioned by OneAsia.

Beginning in 2016, the event was co-sanctioned with the European Tour. From 2017 it was also co-sanctioned by the Asian Tour. Prize money was A$1,500,000 in 2016 and 2017 and A$1,250,000 in 2018.

Winners

Notes

References

External links
Official site
Coverage on the PGA Tour of Australasia's official site
Coverage on the Asian Tour's official site
Coverage on the European Tour's official site

Former PGA Tour of Australasia events
Former European Tour events
Former Asian Tour events
Golf tournaments in Fiji
Recurring sporting events established in 2014
Recurring sporting events disestablished in 2018
2014 establishments in Fiji
2018 disestablishments in Fiji